Rachel Kealaonapua "Keala" O'Sullivan (later Watson, born November 3, 1950) is an American former diver. In 1965, she won the U.S. Junior AAU one-meter board diving championships. She represented the United States at the 1968 Olympics, where she earned a bronze medal in three-meter springboard; this made her the first Hawaiian athlete to medal in diving.

O'Sullivan retired after failing to qualify for the 1972 Olympics. She then returned to Hawaii, where she coached divers at ʻIolani School. In 1999, she was inducted into the Hawaii Sports Hall of Fame.

References

1950 births
American female divers
Divers at the 1968 Summer Olympics
Living people
Medalists at the 1968 Summer Olympics
Olympic bronze medalists for the United States in diving
People from Hawaii
Sportspeople from Honolulu
21st-century American women
Patrick Sullivan the 5th